William Barnett (dates of birth and death unknown) was an English cricketer who active in first-class cricket in the 1830s. Barnett made his first-class debut for The Bs against Marylebone Cricket Club (MCC) at Lord's, before playing four first-class matches for MCC in 1837 and 1838. In his five first-class matches, Barnett scored 43 runs with a high-score of 14. Barnett's batting style is unknown.

References

External links

English cricketers
The Bs cricketers
Marylebone Cricket Club cricketers